Richmond Nii Lamptey (born 18 March 1997) is a Ghanaian professional footballer who plays as a midfielder for Ghana Premier League club Asante Kotoko. He has capped once for the Ghana national team.

Club career

WAFA 
Lamptey joined West African Football Academy (WAFA) at the age of twelve. He progressed through the age groups playing for the U-13, U-17 till he was promoted to the senior team in 2015. He played three seasons with the senior team in the Ghana Premier League and was part of the squad that placed second in the 2017 season, the club's highest ever position in the history of the league. He played an important role that season, by playing 26 league matches, scoring one goal and providing five assists. His performance over the season drew in interest from several clubs. He left the club after his contract expired ending a nine-year stint with the Sogakope-based team.

Inter Allies 
On 25 January 2018, International Allies announced that they had signed Lamptey as a free agent on three-year contract. On 3 February 2019, Lamptey signed for Lebanese Premier League side Salam Zgharta on a loan deal till the end of the 2018–19 season. He returned to the Inter Allies and was appointed as the club captain for the 2019–20 season. In the 2020–21 season, he played 30 matches, scored 3 goals, provided two assists and won four man of the match awards. He made headlines within the season with his 40-yard thunderbolt strike against Hearts of Oak in November 2020. That strike led Inter Allies to their first victory of the season.

Asante Kotoko 
In September 2021, Lamptey signed for Asante Kotoko on a three-year deal, making him the first signing of newly appointed coach Prosper Narteh Ogum.

International career 
Lamptey represented Ghana in the youth levels, including for the Ghana U17 in 2013 before being promoted to the Ghana U20. In 2017, he was a member of the Ghana squad that won the WAFU Cup of Nations.

Honours 
Asante Kotoko

 Ghana Premier League: 2021–22

Ghana

 WAFU Cup of Nations: 2017

References

External links 
 
 
 
 

Living people
1997 births
Footballers from Accra
Ghanaian footballers
Association football midfielders
West African Football Academy players
International Allies F.C. players
Salam Zgharta FC players
Asante Kotoko S.C. players
Ghana Premier League players
Lebanese Premier League players
Ghana international footballers
Ghana youth international footballers
Ghanaian expatriate footballers
Ghanaian expatriate sportspeople in Lebanon
Expatriate footballers in Lebanon